Peter Bernardine Collingridge, O.F.M.Rec. (10 March 1757 – 3 March 1829) was an English Roman Catholic bishop who served as the Vicar Apostolic of the Western District of England and Wales from 1809 to 1829.

Life
Born at Fritwell, Oxfordshire, Collingridge was appointed coadjutor to Bishop William Gregory Sharrock, Vicar Apostolic of the Western District on 13 January 1807. On the same day, he was appointed Titular Bishop of Thespiae, and consecrated on 11 October 1807.

On 18 October 1809, aged 52, he succeeded to Vicar Apostolic of the Western District.

On 3 March 1829, Bishop Collingridge died, at Cannington, Somersetshire, one week before his 72nd birthday the same year as Catholic Emancipation. He had been a bishop for 21 years.

Notes

References

External links
UK National Archives
UK Catholic History site
Catholic Hierarchy/Collingridge biodata
Coventry Catholic Deanery site

1757 births
1829 deaths
Recollects
English Friars Minor
People from Cherwell District
19th-century Roman Catholic bishops in England
Apostolic vicars of England and Wales